Diamond Wave is the sixth studio album by Japanese recording artist Mai Kuraki. It was released on August 2, 2006.

Background 
The album was released in two formats: CD+DVD limited edition and CD only standard edition. On August 11, a limited revamped (cover and booklet) standard edition was released. Diamond Wave is Kuraki's first album to be released in various formats. A limited blog called "Diamond Web" was opened in commemoration of the release. To view the blog two passwords enclosed in both the Diamond Wave album and single were needed. To date this is the last studio album released in Giza Studio.

Chart performance 
Diamond Wave debuted on the Oricon albums chart at #3 with 78,228 copies sold. The album charted for a total of 12 weeks. Diamond Wave was the 101st best selling album of 2006.

Track listing

Charts

Certifications

Release history

References

External links 

2006 albums
Mai Kuraki albums
Being Inc. albums
Giza Studio albums
Japanese-language albums
Albums produced by Daiko Nagato